Rati Amaglobeli (born 1977) is a Georgian poet and translator.

He studied Philology at the Tbilisi State University, until 2000, published his poems in anthologies and magazines since 1994. His debut The Verb was released in 2000.

Amaglobeli is famous for his live performances, which made him a shooting star of contemporary poetry not only in Georgia.  He read at the 2nd Moscow Festival of Poets.  He was a host of the website www.azrebi.ge; a conference took place at the Ilia State University bookstore "Ligamus."

He also translated Goethe, Morgenstern, Nietzsche, Rilke, Tsvetaeva, Akhmatova and Brodsky into Georgian.
He appeared on CD with Post Industrial Boys.

Since 2011 year Rati Amaghlobeli is a President of Georgian Pen Center.

Amaglobeli lives in Tbilisi.

Works
 Tu January 2003
 Dges: Krebuli January 2003
 Zmna January 2000

References

External links
 author page at Lyrikline.org, with audio and text in Georgian, and translations into German and Dutch.
rati amaglobeli / lexebis krebuli 
Georgian Literature

1977 births
20th-century poets from Georgia (country)
Living people
Translators from Georgia (country)
21st-century poets from Georgia (country)
Male poets from Georgia (country)
20th-century male writers
21st-century male writers